Ingrid Hadler (born Ingrid Thoresen; 12 February 1946) is a former orienteering competitor and cross-country skier from Norway. She won the 1970 Individual World Orienteering Championships in Eisenach, and received a silver medal in Linköping in 1968. She won the gold medal in the Relay event at the World Orienteering Championship in 1968, the silver medal in 1974, and the bronze medal in 1966 and 1970.

She is co-author of the book På tvers av stiene: Med giftering, kort og kompass (1970) with her husband Åge Hadler.

References

1946 births
Living people
Norwegian orienteers
Female orienteers
Foot orienteers
World Orienteering Championships medalists
Sportspeople from Trondheim
20th-century Norwegian women